Guéymard is a French surname that may refer to
 Adolphe G. Gueymard, American businessman
 38269 Gueymard, a main-belt asteroid
 Louis Guéymard (1822–1880), French operatic tenor 
 Pauline Guéymard-Lauters (1834–1908), Belgian opera singer 

French-language surnames